Light over Russia is a 1947 Soviet history propaganda film directed by Sergei Yutkevich.

Plot 
The film illustrates the memories of a sailor who survived the Revolution and the Great Patriotic War.

Starring 
 Nikolai Kolesnikov as Vladimir Lenin
Mikheil Gelovani as Joseph Stalin
Vasily Markov as Felix Dzerzhinsky
Boris Olenin-Girshman as Gleb Krzhizhanovsky
Nikolay Okhlopkov as Anton Ivanovich Zabelin, engineer
Kira Golovko as Masha Zabelina (credited as K. Ivanova)
Nikolai Kryuchkov as Aleksandr Rybakov, sailor
Benjamin Zuskin as watchmaker
Sergei Tsenin as H. G. Wells
Boris Livanov as Vladimir Mayakovsky
Vasili Vanin as soldier
Boris Tolmazov as Lastochkin, Red Army soldier
Vladimir Maryev as Red Army soldier
Sergey Filippov as speculator
 Yelena Yelina as Lidiya Mikhailovna, Zabelin's wife
Maria Yarotskaya as Dasha, servant of Zabelins
Lidiya Sukharevskaya as Yelena Vyacheslavovna, frightened lady
Yelena Tyapkina as lady with knitting
Rostislav Plyatt as Optimist

References

External links 
 

1947 films
1940s historical films
Cultural depictions of Vladimir Lenin
Cultural depictions of Joseph Stalin
Films scored by Aram Khachaturian
1940s Russian-language films
Soviet black-and-white films
Soviet historical films
Soviet revolutionary propaganda films
Films about Vladimir Lenin